Tuscobia  is an unincorporated community in the town of Oak Grove, Barron County, Wisconsin, United States.

History
A post office called Tuscobia was in operation from 1902 until 1905. The etymology of the name Tuscobia is unclear. It may be derived from a Native American language meaning "level place" but there are several other theories.

Notes

Unincorporated communities in Barron County, Wisconsin
Unincorporated communities in Wisconsin